Marigene Gertrude Valiquette (born 1924) is a former member of the Ohio General Assembly.  She served 24 consecutive years in the state legislature, first as a member of the Ohio House of Representatives, beginning in 1963, and subsequently as a member of the Ohio State Senate, from 1969 until 1986.

Career 
During her third year of law school at the University of Toledo, Valiquette became a law clerk for Judge Geraldine Macelwane in 1959 after an unsuccessful run for city council.

For most of her 18 years as a state senator, Valiquette was the only female senator in office. She became chair of the Judiciary Committee in 1971; later she chaired the Ethics Committee. During a period in the 1980s when the Democratic Party was in the majority, she was a ranking member on both the Finance and the Rules Committee.

In the early 1970s, as a state senator, Valiquette advocated strongly for Ohio's passage of the Equal Rights Amendment (ERA), the proposed amendment to the United States Constitution that aimed to guarantee equal rights for women; in February 1974 Ohio became the 33rd state to ratify the ERA.

In 1985 and 1986, Valiquette was absent from the Ohio Senate for a number of months which ended her career. The absences were attributed to family deaths and financial issues.

In 1978, she was inducted into the Ohio Women's Hall of Fame.

References

Democratic Party Ohio state senators
Politicians from Toledo, Ohio
Democratic Party members of the Ohio House of Representatives
Women state legislators in Ohio
Living people
1924 births
21st-century American women